USS Pelican (MSC(O)-32/AMS-32/YMS-441) was a  acquired by the U.S. Navy for the task of removing mines that had been placed in the water to prevent ships from passing.

History
Pelican was laid down as YMS-441 on 27 November 1943 by Robert Jacob Inc. of City Island, New York; launched 13 November 1944; and commissioned 21 February 1945.
 
After shakedown on the east coast, YMS-441 sailed for the Pacific 10 April, finally arriving at Okinawa in August. While there, she participated in minesweeping exercises and in several minesweeping operations with the U.S. 3rd Fleet.

Returning to the United States in February 1946, YMS-441 operated along the California coast until November, when she sailed to Guam. Arriving in Guam in January 1947, YMS-441 swept for mines in the Caroline and Marshall islands.

While at Guam, YMS-441 was named USS Pelican and classified AMS-32 on 18 February. Sailing for Pearl Harbor in late September, Pelican arrived in October and immediately entered the yards to be outfitted as an experimental ship for the Eniwetok atomic bomb tests. All her minesweeping gear was removed and special electronic gear was installed. Based in the Eniwetok Atoll area, she supported the test in the first half of 1948. After returning to Pearl Harbor in June 1948, the electronic gear was removed and her minesweeping gear was replaced. Pelican remained in the Hawaiian Islands area for the next two years of her service.
 
At the start of the Korean War, USS Pelican deployed to Korea.

She remained in the Far East until 1955. On 7 February, she was reclassified MSC(O)-32 and on 16 April of that year, she was loaned to Japan, becoming Ogishima (MSC-659).

Returned to the U.S. Navy in April 1968, she was struck from the Naval Vessel Register on 1 May 1968.

References

External links 
 
 U.S. NAVY SHIPS IN THE KOREAN WAR 
 Pelican (AMS-32)
 USS Pelican - MSCO 32
 uboat.net - Allied Warships - Minesweeper USS YMS-441 of the YMS class

YMS-1-class minesweepers of the United States Navy
Ships built in City Island, Bronx
1944 ships
World War II minesweepers of the United States
Korean War minesweepers of the United States
YMS-1-class minesweepers of the Japan Maritime Self-Defense Force